USS ATA-214 was the lead ship of the  of tugs for the United States Navy and was built near the end of World War II. Before completion, the name Palo Blanco was cancelled and the ship was named ATA-214, an unnamed auxiliary ocean tug. Palo Blanco served in the Pacific Theatre during her brief career with the Navy.

Career 
Palo Blanco (ATA–214) was laid down 22 May 1943 as YN–85 at Canulette Shipbuilding Co., Slidell, Louisiana; re-designated AN–64, 20 January 1944; launched 17 June 1944; sponsored by Mrs. Isabella A. Gamage; re-designated ATA–214, 12 August 1944; lost the name Palo Blanco; and commissioned 25 September 1944. During her brief war-time career, ATA–214 served in the Pacific Ocean. In July 1945, she provided auxiliary tug services in and around Leyte Gulf. On the 12th, she steamed to Buckner Bay, Okinawa, but returned to San Pedro Bay, Leyte the 25th.  After the war, the ship decommissioned in September 1945; she was transferred to the U.S. Maritime Commission 30 April 1947.

References 
  
 NavSource Online: YN-85 / AN-64 Palo Blanco - ATA-214

 

ATA-214-class tugs
Ships built in Slidell, Louisiana
1944 ships
World War II auxiliary ships of the United States